Joseph Hasbrouck Tuthill (February 25, 1811 – July 27, 1877) was a U.S. Representative from New York, nephew of Selah Tuthill.

Biography
Joseph. H. Tuthill was born in Blooming Grove, New York on February 25, 1811. He was educated in Blooming Grove and Shawangunk, where he moved with his parents in 1824.

He moved to New York City in 1828, Ulsterville (now a hamlet of Wawarsing) in 1832, and Ellenville (also part of Wawarsing) in 1834. Tuthill was a merchant and farmer, including serving as President of the Ellenville Glass Works and President of the Ellenville Savings Bank. In addition, he served as Ellenville's Postmaster.

A Democrat, he served as Wawarsing Town Supervisor and a member of the Ulster County Board of Supervisors from 1842 to 1843, 1862 to 1863 and 1866 to 1869. From 1843 to 1847 he was County Clerk.

During the Civil War Tuthill served as Excise Commissioner for Ulster County, responsible for collecting taxes on goods and services levied to support the war effort and assessing fines on individuals who attempted to evade paying the taxes.

Tuthill was an unsuccessful candidate for Congress in 1866. In 1870 he ran successfully for a seat in the Forty-second Congress and served one term, March 4, 1871 to March 3, 1873.

Death and burial
He died in Ellenville on July 27, 1877. He was interred in Fantinekill Cemetery, near Ellenville.

Family
Joseph H. Tuthill was the nephew of Selah Tuthill, who was also elected to Congress, but died before taking his seat.

References

External links

1811 births
1877 deaths
People from Blooming Grove, New York
People from Wawarsing, New York
New York (state) postmasters
Town supervisors in New York (state)
People of New York (state) in the American Civil War
Democratic Party members of the United States House of Representatives from New York (state)
19th-century American politicians